The Cote Blanche Bridge crosses Bayou Lafourche at West 79th Street in the town of Cut Off, Louisiana.

References

Pontoon bridges in the United States
Road bridges in Louisiana
1956 establishments in Louisiana
Bridges completed in 1956